Bahattin Hekimoğlu (born 12 January 1989) is a Turkish world and European champion para-archer competing in the men's recurve bow W1 (wheelchair) event.

Early years
Hekimoğlu was born in the Şişli district of Istanbul, Turkey on 12 January 1989.

After finishing high school in 2006, Hekimoğlu was about to enroll at Sakarya University. During the summer vacation that year, he went with his friends to Heybeliada, Istanbul to swim. Hekimoğlu hit the seabed after he jumped headfirst into the sea from the pier. He broke his neck, could not get out of the water, drowned, and his heart stopped. He was rescued by a physician, and was rushed to a hospital. He later learned that he was paralyzed following surgery for the spinal cord injury. He was not able to walk, and did not leave his home for the next two years. In 2008, his life changed when he received a motorized wheelchair from the "Türkiye Omurilik Felçlileri Derneği - TOFD" ("Turkey Spinal Cord Paralytics Association").

In 2013, Hekimoğlu joined the project "Disabled Designers - The Swallow Project" and received vocational training in graphic design. After twelve months of training, he was employed by the TOFD.

Sports career
In 2016, Hekimoğlu decided to get involved in sport. He exercised three months long with pulleys for physical strength. By December of that year, he joined the "Okçular Vakfı Spor Kulübü" ("Archers Foundation Sports Club") obtaining his license. He became champion in the Turkish Outdoor Para Archery Championship.

Competing in the W1 class of the recurve division, Hekimoğlu won the gold medal at the 2018 European Para Archery Championships held in Plzeň, Czech Republic. He took the gold medal in the Individual W1 event at the 2019 World Para Archery Championship in 's-Hertogenbosch, Netherlands. At the 2021 Fazza Para Archery World Ranking Tournament held in Dubai, United Arab Emirates, he captured two gold medals, one in the Individual W1 and the other in the mixed team event together with his teammate Fatma Danabaş.

References

1989 births
Living people
People from Şişli
Sportspeople from Istanbul
Turkish male archers
Paralympic archers of Turkey
Wheelchair category Paralympic competitors
Paralympic bronze medalists for Turkey
Medalists at the 2020 Summer Paralympics
Paralympic medalists in archery
Islamic Solidarity Games medalists in archery
21st-century Turkish people